Elections to Ipswich Borough Council were held on 6 May 2021. The elections included the seats that were planned to be elected on 7 May 2020, but were postponed due to the COVID-19 pandemic. Usually 16 seats – one in each of the 16 wards – are contested at each election. However, due to the resignation of former Labour Councillor and Mayor Jan Parry in Holywells ward, as well as Conservative Councillor Robin Vickery in Castle Hill, two by-elections were held on the same day. Thus, 18 seats were up for election.

The Conservatives made significant gains. Winning Gainsborough, Holywells, Sprites, Stoke Park and Whitton from the Labour Party. In addition, the Conservatives won the Holywells by-election. Thus gaining 6 seats. 

The Labour Party retained a small majority of 12 seats, down from 24.

Results summary
The list candidates nominated were published on 8 April 2021. There were two by-elections carried out at the same time, making 18 in total. The results were made available on 7 May 2021.

Ward results

Alexandra

Bixley

Bridge

Castle Hill

Gainsborough

Gipping

Holywells

Priory Heath

Rushmere

Sprites

St. John's

St. Margaret's

Stoke Park

Westgate

Whitehouse

Whitton

References

Ipswich
Ipswich Borough Council elections